ML or ml may refer to:

Computing and mathematics
 ML (programming language), a general-purpose functional programming language
 .ml, the top-level Internet domain for Mali
 Machine language, the direct instructions to a computer's central processing unit (CPU)
 Machine learning, a field of computer science
 Markup language, a system for annotating a document
 Maximum likelihood, a method of estimating the parameters of a statistical model 
 Mathematical Logic, a variation of Quine's system New Foundations

Languages
 Malayalam (ISO 639-1 code), a language
 Meitei Lon (Meiteilon), the endonym of Meitei language

Measurement
 Megalitre or megaliter (ML, Ml, or Mℓ), a unit of volume
 Millilitre or milliliter (mL, ml, or mℓ), a unit of volume
 Millilambert (mL), a non-SI unit of luminance
 Richter magnitude scale (ML), used to measure earthquakes
 Megalangmuir (ML), a unit of exposure of a surface to a given chemical species (convention is 1 ML=monolayer=1 Langmuir)

Other
 1050, in Roman numerals
 ML (film), a 2018 Philippine film
 ML 8-inch shell gun
 ML postcode area, Motherwell postcode area of Scotland
 Dean ML, a model of electric guitar
 Mali (ISO 3166-1 country code), a country in Africa
 Marxism–Leninism, a form of communist ideology as practiced in the Soviet Union and other nations
Marxist–Leninist, a follower of  Marxism–Leninism 
 McConnell Unit, a prison near Beeville, Texas
 Mere Liye (also known as ML), a 2001 album by Sagarika.
 Motor Launch, a type of small Royal Navy vessel used by British Coastal Forces
 Mountain Leader Award, a UK qualification
 MultiLevel Recording, to increase the storage capacity of optical discs
 ml. or mladší, used in Czech–Slovak similarly to Junior
 Malaysia-Singapore Airlines, IATA code ML until 1972
 Midway Airlines (1976–1991), IATA code ML
 Mom Luang, a Thai royal title
 Silt, in the Unified Soil Classification System
Miraculous Ladybug, a French cartoon
 Mobile Legends, short for Mobile Legends: Bang Bang, a mobile MOBA game by Moonton
Merrill Lynch, the wealth management division of Bank of America

See also
 Mercedes-Benz GLE-Class, formerly known as the ML-Class
 M1 (disambiguation)
 MI (disambiguation)
 Metalanguage (disambiguation)